The 2009 Zenit St.Petersburg season was the club's fifteenth season in the Russian Premier League, the highest tier of association football in Russia. Zenit finished third in the Russian Premier League, progressed to the quarterfinal of the 2009–10 Russian Cup, reached the round of 16 in the 2008–09 UEFA Cup and the playoff round of the 2009–10 UEFA Europa League.

Squad

Out on loan

Transfers

In

Out

Loans out

Released

Competitions

Overall record

Premier League

Results by round

Results

League table

Russian Cup

Quarterfinal took place during the 2010 season.

UEFA Cup

UEFA Europa League

Squad statistics

Appearances and goals

|-
|colspan="14"|Players away from the club on loan:
|-
|colspan="14"|Players who left Zenit St.Petersburg during the season:

|}

Goal scorers

Clean sheets

Disciplinary record

References 

Zenit Saint Petersburg
2009